The 2020 Coppa Florio or 2020 Coppa Florio Hankook 12 Hours of Sicily was the first running of the Coppa Florio since 1981. It was the fifth round of both the 2020 24H GT Series and the 2020 24H TCE Series, the fourth round of the Europe Series and was held from 9 to 11 October at the Autodromo di Pergusa. It was the first international racing series to take place at the Autodromo di Pergusa since 2012. The race was won by Frédéric Fatien, Jordan Grogor, Mathieu Jaminet and Robert Renauer. Miklas Born and Autorama Motorsport by Wolf-Power Racing secured the TCE Europe Drivers' and Teams' Championship after they won.

Schedule
The race was be split into two parts, the first being 6 hours and the second being the same distance.

Entry list
A total of twenty-three cars were entered for the event; 17 GT, 5 TCE and 1 Proto car.

Results

Practice
Fastest in class in bold.

Qualifying

GT
Fastest in class in bold.

TCE
Fastest in class in bold.

Race

Part 1
Class winner in bold.

Part 2
Class winner in bold.

References

External links

Coppa Florio
2020 Coppa Florio
2020 in 24H Series